Autonomous navigation could refer to :

 Autonomous aircraft
 autonomous navigation for spacecraft, eg. the Autonav on Deep Space 1
 autonomous navigation of robots (including planetary rovers); see 
 autonomous navigation of ships or watercraft, see Unmanned surface vehicle
 autonomous proximity operations, eg spacecraft rendezvous